Tyldum is a Norwegian surname that may refer to
Ingrid Aunet Tyldum (born 1983), Norwegian cross-country skier
Jon Åge Tyldum (born 1968), Norwegian biathlete
Morten Tyldum (born 1967), Norwegian film director
Pål Tyldum (born 1942), Norwegian cross-country skier 

Norwegian-language surnames